Həkəri FK, also known as FK Hakari, was an Azerbaijani football club based in Baku and home games played in Sumqayit, even though it represents the city of Qubadlı, which is controlled by Nagorno-Karabakh Republic (de facto independent, but recognized only by 3 non-UN member states) but de jure is a part of Azerbaijan.

History
The club was established in 2002 by club's current chairman and manager Javanshir Aliyev as an amateur football club. In 2011, the club transformed into the professional club and immediately admitted to the Azerbaijan First Division in 2011.

In 2011, club's owners announced that club will be dissolved and all of their results in Azerbaijan First Division will be annulled.

Honours 
 AFFA Amateur League
 Winners (1) : 2003–04

References

External links 
 Official Facebook Page
 Həkəri FK at PFL.AZ

Football clubs in Azerbaijan
Association football clubs established in 2002
Association football clubs disestablished in 2011
2002 establishments in Azerbaijan
2011 disestablishments in Azerbaijan